Joy Newton Houck Jr. (January 26, 1942 – October 1, 2003) was an American actor, screenwriter and film director who is probably best known for Creature from Black Lake, one of the many Bigfoot horror films of the 1970s.

His father, Joy Newton Houck Sr., founded Howco—a production and distribution company for low-budget films.

Filmography

Director

Actor

References

External links

1942 births
2003 deaths
American male actors
American male screenwriters
20th-century American male writers
20th-century American screenwriters